Jeju United Football Club (Hangul: 제주 유나이티드) is a South Korean professional football club based in Jeju Province that competes in the K League 1, the top division in South Korea. In the past, the club has been known as the Yukong Elephants and Bucheon SK.

History
An original member of the K League founded on 17 December 1982, the team was then called the Yukong Elephants. Yukong was owned and financially supported by the Sunkyoung Group's subsidiary, Yukong (currently SK Group's "SK Energy"), along with Seoul, Incheon, Gyeonggi as its franchise. The Kokkiri (elephant) was its mascot.  The club won the league championship on only one occasion (in 1989).

At the end of 1995 the side moved from the Dongdaemun Stadium in Seoul to the Mokdong Stadium on the western edge of Seoul, as part of K-League's decentralization policy.

Three clubs based in Seoul–the Yukong Elephants, LG Cheetahs, and Ilhwa Chunma–didn't accept this policy, so the Seoul government gave an eviction order to the three clubs.  However they guaranteed that if clubs built a soccer-specific stadium in Seoul, they could have a Seoul franchise and return to Seoul.  As a result, the three clubs were evicted from Seoul to other cities. The Yukong Elephants moved to the city of Bucheon, a satellite city of Seoul. Mid-way through the 1997 season, the club re-branded itself as Bucheon SK.

Because the city of Bucheon lacked a stadium, they used Mokdong Stadium in Seoul until 2000. At the start of the 2001 season, the team moved to the 35,545-capacity Bucheon Leports Complex.

In 2006, Bucheon SK announced their move to Jeju without any fore notice, renamed themselves "Jeju United FC," and adopted the vacant Jeju World Cup Stadium as their new home ground. Jeju Province had never been represented in top flight South Korean football until then.

On January 3, 2008, Jeju appointed Arthur Bernardes for new manager. On October 14, 2009, Arthur Bernardes announced his resignation due to Jeju's bad form in the K-League.

On November 24, 2019, Jeju lost their penultimate match of the season to the Suwon Samsung Bluewings, which meant the club could no longer avoid relegation to the K League 2.

Franchise relocation history

Kits

Kit suppliers
 1983–99: Adidas
 2000–01: Fila
 2002–03: Puma
 2004–08: Diadora
 2009–12: Astore
 2013–2019 : Kika
 2020–2022: Puma
 2022–present: Fila

Players

Current squad

Out on loan

Honours

League 
 K League 1
Winners (1): 1989
Runners-up (5): 1984, 1994, 2000, 2010, 2017

 K League 2
Winners (1): 2020

Cups 
 FA Cup
Runners-up (1): 2004
 League Cup
Winners (3): 1994, 1996, 2000s
Runners-up (2): 1998, 1998s

Records

Key
Tms. = Number of teams
Pos. = Position in league

AFC Champions League record
All results (home and away) list Jeju United's goal tally first.

Managers

Coaching staff

Managerial history

References

External links

 Official website 

 
SK Sports
Sport in Jeju Province
K League 1 clubs
K League 2 clubs
Association football clubs established in 1982
1982 establishments in South Korea